Nutritional Neuroscience is a peer-reviewed scientific journal published by Taylor & Francis covering research at the intersection between neuroscience and food science, the field of nutritional neuroscience. The founding editor is Chandan Prasad (Texas Woman's University). The editor-in-chief is Byron C. Jones (University of Tennessee Health Science Center).

Abstracting and indexing 
The journal is abstracted and indexed in :

According to the Journal Citation Reports, the journal has a 2020 impact factor of 5.000.

References

External links 
 

Neuroscience journals
Nutrition and dietetics journals
Taylor & Francis academic journals
Publications established in 1998
Bimonthly journals
English-language journals